24K is a South Korean boy band formed by Choeun Entertainment. It currently consists of six members: Changsun, Kiyong, Imchan, Xiwoo, Yuma and Takeru. The group's debut took place on September 6, 2012 with their debut mini album Hurry Up.

History

2012–2013: 4K, Hurry Up, and U R So Cute
Prior to the debut of the group, the acoustic pop sub-unit 4K debuted. Consisting of vocalists Cory, Seokjune, Kisu, and Sungoh, they released Rocking Girl in June 2012. With the addition of Daeil and Byungho, 24K released their first mini album Hurry Up and the title song on September 6. On January 16 of the following year, 24K began an additional promotion cycle for the record by performing "Secret Love."

24K released their second mini album U R So Cute on August 1, 2013. A "cute" concept, the title track features a "hard rock guitar sound" mixed with a "European-style house beat."

2014–2015: Lineup changes, "Hey You" and "Super Fly"
Member Dae-il participated in Mnet's TV show, Dancing 9 Season 2.

24K returned after a 2-year hiatus with the digital single, "Hey You," along with two new members, Hui and Jinhong.

On October 1, 2015, 24K made a comeback with their third mini album Super Fly and the title track of the same name.

2016–2017: Further lineup changes, "Still 24K", The Real One and Addiction

24K had their first European concert in Warsaw, Poland on January 23, 2016 at Progresja Music Zone Main Stage, without Sung-oh. They held a showcase in Malaysia on April 22–24 which was presented by New Pro Star, with Sungoh and Daeil being absent for unknown reasons. On August 1, Choeun Entertainment made an official statement saying that members Daeil and Sungoh would be on hiatus; Sungoh was receiving medical treatment for his dislocated shoulder and Daeil had chosen to take a personal leave, although it was later discovered that Daeil had left the group to debut as a solo artist under the name "Big One". The statement also revealed that two new members, Changsun and Hongseob, would be added to continue as a seven-member group. 24K released the digital single "Still 24K" on August 11.

On October 21, 24K returned with their first full-length album titled The Real One containing previously released singles "Secret Love," "Hey You," "Super Fly," "Still 24K" and the title track "Bingo."

24K kicked off their first World tour on December 7, 2016 in 4 Brazilian cities and continued with European tour on January 3, 2017 in Milan, Italy and continued to tour to Helsinki FI, London UK, Warsaw PL, Lisbon PT, Cologne DE, Bucharest RO and finished on January 15, 2017 in Paris, France. Furthermore, in late March 2017 it was announced that 24K would have an encore tour to visit 4 more highly requested countries. The encore tour started on April 2, 2017 in Moscow, Russia and toured to Stockholm Sweden, Madrid Spain and finished on April 9, 2017 in Amsterdam, Netherlands.

24K released their comeback single and MV "Only You" from their single album Addiction on May 26, 2017.

On November 2, Choeun Entertainment made a statement confirming that as of July 6, 2017, Hui had officially left the group, it was also confirmed that Daeil was no longer a member, and that Sungoh's future with the company is to be discussed after he completes his mandatory military service. The remaining six members participated in the JTBC's Survival show Mix Nine.

2018–present: Blacklist, Kisu's enlistment and new members 
On May 9, an interview with Billboard revealed that the group’s upcoming EP was set to be released on May 25, with the title track titled Bonnie N Clyde.

Also on May 9, it was revealed that 24K was the only idol group that was put on the blacklist by former president Park Geun-hye. The impeached president put together a blacklist of celebrities to exclude them from receiving any support from the state. The blacklist's existence was made known in October 2016 before the president's impeachment, the full list being uncovered in April. A representative of the blacklist declared that the blacklist consisted of those who expressed any sort of support against governmental commands about the Sewol accident and artists who opposed presidential candidates Park Won-soon and Moon Jae-in. The blacklist includes their former manager and members Seokjune, Byungho, Cory, Kisu, and Daeil.

On May 11, the company announced that member Kisu would be enlisting in the military to carry out his military service while the group makes another change to the lineup and add a new member named Kiyong. On May 25, 24K released their fourth EP Bonnie N Clyde.

On January 25, 2019, the company announced that member and leader Cory would be leaving 24K since his exclusive contract with the company has expired and will pursue his career as a producer with his new stage name "Corbyn". Cory has also released his solo song and music video "Million Dollar Dream", aka. "M$D" on February 27, 2019, on his official 28Laboratory youtube channel. It was also stated that Sungoh would not continue as a member of the group and instead will work under Choeun Entertainment as music producer for 24K.

On June 26, 2019, the company announced that Jinhong was not renewing his contract, Hongseob would not be able to continue due to health reasons, and Jeonguk has chosen to concentrate on his solo work. Additionally, Kisu announced on his Twitter that he would not return with the group either. The company shared that they will add new members and described it as 24K season 2 coming soon.

On April 2, 2020, the company announced that the new member named Dojun joined the group. On May 26, 2020, the four remaining members of 24K had announced that the hidden member, #5 and Dojun had left citing personal differences. Member #5's name and face were revealed after he left and became an A+ Entertainment trainee and the leader of their upcoming boy group A+ Boys.

On December 23, 2020, photos of a new member were published, his name is Youngwoong.

On June 12, 2021, 24K released the digital single "Welcome to the Mainstreet".

2022-present: New members and concert in japan

On April 28, 2022, it was announced that member Youngwoong would be leaving the group and that 24K would be working hard on new members that would be revealed in the future.

On July 22–23, 2022 Yuma and Takeru was announced as a new members of 24K.

Musical style and influences
Upon debut, 24K employed various genres into its music. On the EP Hurry Up, the record incorporated pop, trance, dubstep, and industrial into its sound. On the second EP U R So Cute, the group incorporated elements of hip hop and electronic dance music into its sound.

Cory has expressed his admiration for hip hop producers Dr. Dre and Teddy Park. Kisu was influenced by Urban Zakapa, which led to his fascination with R&B and soul music.

Members

Current
 Changsun
 Kiyong
 Imchan
 Xiwoo
 Yuma (유마)
 Takeru (타케루)

Former
 Byungho
 Seokjun
 Sungoh
 Daeil
 Hui
 Cory
 Kisu
 Jeonguk
 Jinhong
 Hongseob
 Dojun
 Youmin (유민)
 Youngwoong (영웅)

Timeline

Discography

Studio albums

Extended plays

Singles

Videography

Music videos

Concerts and tours

World tours
2017/2018: First World Tour "Still With 24U"

Encore tours
2017-2018: First Encore Tour "Still With 24U, The Encore"

European concerts
2016: First European concert in Warsaw, Poland on January 23.

Fanmeeting Tours
2017: "Only You" Europe Fan Meeting Tour.

References

External links

 

2012 establishments in South Korea
K-pop music groups
Musical groups established in 2012
South Korean boy bands
South Korean dance music groups
South Korean hip hop groups
South Korean pop music groups
Peak Time contestants